In mathematics, the converse relation, or transpose, of a binary relation is the relation that occurs when the order of the elements is switched in the relation. For example, the converse of the relation 'child of' is the relation 'parent of'.

The notation is analogous with that for an inverse function. Although many functions do not have an inverse, every relation does have a unique converse. The unary operation that maps a relation to the converse relation is an involution, so it induces the structure of a semigroup with involution on the binary relations on a set, or, more generally, induces a dagger category on the category of relations as detailed below. As a unary operation, taking the converse (sometimes called conversion or transposition) commutes with the order-related operations of the calculus of relations, that is it commutes with union, intersection, and complement.

Since a relation may be represented by a logical matrix, and the logical matrix of the converse relation is the transpose of the original, the converse relation is also called the transpose relation. It has also been called the opposite or dual of the original relation, or the inverse of the original relation, or the reciprocal  of the relation 

Other notations for the converse relation include  or

Examples
For the usual (maybe strict or partial) order relations, the converse is the naively expected "opposite" order, for examples, 

A relation may be represented by a logical matrix such as

Then the converse relation is represented by its transpose matrix:

The converse of kinship relations are named: " is a child of " has converse " is a parent of ".  " is a nephew or niece of " has converse " is an uncle or aunt of ". The relation " is a sibling of " is its own converse, since it is a symmetric relation.

Properties
The converse relation does satisfy the (weaker) axioms of a semigroup with involution:  and 

Since one may generally consider relations between different sets (which form a category rather than a monoid, namely the category of relations Rel), in this context the converse relation conforms to the axioms of a dagger category (aka category with involution). A relation equal to its converse is a symmetric relation; in the language of dagger categories, it is self-adjoint.

Furthermore, the semigroup of endorelations on a set is also a partially ordered structure (with inclusion of relations as sets), and actually an involutive quantale. Similarly, the category of heterogeneous relations, Rel is also an ordered category.

In the calculus of relations,  (the unary operation of taking the converse relation) commutes with other binary operations of union and intersection. Conversion also commutes with unary operation of complementation as well as with taking suprema and infima. Conversion is also compatible with the ordering of relations by inclusion.

If a relation is reflexive, irreflexive, symmetric, antisymmetric, asymmetric, transitive, connected, trichotomous, a partial order, total order, strict weak order, total preorder (weak order),  or an equivalence relation, its converse is too.

Inverses
If  represents the identity relation, then a relation  may have an inverse as follows:  is called

if it is both right-invertible and left-invertible. 

For an invertible homogeneous relation  all right and left inverses coincide; this unique set is called its  and it is denoted by  In this case,  holds.

Converse relation of a function
A function is invertible if and only if its converse relation is a function, in which case the converse relation is the inverse function.

The converse relation of a function  is the relation  defined by the 

This is not necessarily a function: One necessary condition is that  be injective, since else   is multi-valued. This condition is sufficient for  being a partial function, and it is clear that  then is a (total) function if and only if  is surjective. In that case, meaning if  is bijective,  may be called the inverse function of 

For example, the function  has the inverse function 

However, the function  has the inverse relation  which is not a function, being multi-valued.

Composition with relation
Using composition of relations, the converse may be composed with the original relation. For example, the subset relation composed with its converse is always the universal relation:
∀A ∀B ∅ ⊂ A ∩B ⇔ A ⊃ ∅ ⊂  B ⇔ A ⊃ ⊂ B. Similarly,
For U =  universe, A ∪ B ⊂ U ⇔ A ⊂ U ⊃ B ⇔ A ⊂ ⊃ B.

Now  consider the set membership relation and its converse.

Thus  
The opposite composition  is the universal relation.

The compositions are used to classify relations according to type: for a relation Q, when the identity relation on the range of Q contains QTQ, then Q is called univalent. When the identity  relation on the domain of Q is contained in Q QT, then Q is called total. When Q is both univalent and total then it is a function. When QT is univalent, then Q is termed injective. When QT is total, Q is termed surjective.

If Q is univalent, then QQT is an equivalence relation on the domain of Q, see Transitive relation#Related properties.

See also

References

 

Binary relations
Mathematical logic